Chloroselas tamaniba is a Butterfly in the family Lycaenidae. It is found in Sudan.

Taxonomy
The type is lost and the identity of this species is unclear. It might be a nomen dubium.

References

Butterflies described in 1870
Butterflies of Africa
Endemic fauna of Sudan
Chloroselas
Taxa named by Francis Walker (entomologist)